Gerald W Penford (born 4 September 1986) is a former Zimbabwean cricketer. A right-handed batsman and a right-arm medium pace bowler, he played two first-class matches for Manicaland in 2005 and three first-class matches for KwaZulu-Natal Inland in 2008.

Penford was born in Dallas, Texas, United States.

References

External links
 
 

1986 births
Living people
Manicaland cricketers
KwaZulu-Natal Inland cricketers
Zimbabwean cricketers
Zimbabwean expatriate sportspeople in South Africa
Naturalised citizens of Zimbabwe
Sportspeople from Dallas
American emigrants to Zimbabwe
American cricketers